Vaissière may refer to:

People 
 Étienne de la Vaissière, French scholar
 Jacqueline Vaissière, French phonetician
 Magali Vaissière, director at the European Space Agency

Other 
 Vaissière, a minor planet

See also 
 Vayssière